The Medford Hotel was an historic building in Medford, Oregon, United States. The hotel was listed on the National Register of Historic Places in 1988 but was severely damaged by a fire in the same year during a renovation. The building has since been remodeled and serves as an apartment complex.

See also
 National Register of Historic Places listings in Jackson County, Oregon

References

Buildings and structures in Oregon
Hotel buildings on the National Register of Historic Places in Oregon
National Register of Historic Places in Jackson County, Oregon